Critical Path is a book written by US author and inventor R. Buckminster Fuller with the assistance of Kiyoshi Kuromiya. First published in 1981, it is alongside Operating Manual for Spaceship Earth one of Fuller's best-known works. Vast in its scope, it describes Fuller's own vision of the development of human civilization, economic history, and his highly original economic ideology based, amongst other things, on his detailed description of why scarcity of resources need no longer be a decisive factor in global politics.

Overview 
The following is a list of the main claims and opinions presented in the book, reported without discussion or criticism.

Part One 
The first part of the book explains the history and present state of the global economy.

Chapter 1 - Speculative Prehistory of Humanity 
Human life began in the atolls of the South Pacific, where the average sea temperature is closest to that of the human body (p. 6). Rather than evolving from simpler organisms, humanity was of extraterrestrial origin and other organisms evolved from us (p. 7). From this base, humanity developed boat-building in Southeast Asia and colonised the rest of the planet (p. 15). There is evidence that the Bronze Age began in Southeast Asia (p. 17). Fuller's Dymaxion World Map is used to show the distribution of humanity over the Earth's surface. Over half the population lives in the regions watered by the Himalayan glaciers (p. 20).

Chapter 2 - Humans in Universe 
Our knowledge of the spherical shape of the Earth is central to our understanding of ecology (p. 34). This knowledge probably originated in prehistoric times, was certainly known to the Ancient Greeks, but was then suppressed for centuries by organised religion because it was incompatible with the official story of a Heaven above and a Hell below (p. 43). There has been an evolution of religious ideas from those of the Egyptian pyramid-builders, whose ambition was to deliver a single individual, the pharaoh, into the afterlife, to the modern belief that everybody has a right to enjoy life on Earth (p. 51).

Chapter 3 - Legally Piggily 

Human history has been shaped by the continual growth and success of greed. City-states were the first institutions to make organised use of extortion (p. 68). This was then followed by the growth of international trade, which appropriates the wealth of the planet for its own ends. Corruption in the form of "lawyer-capitalism" has led the U.S.A. to become effectively bankrupt (p. 114), with the common people obliged to fund the profitmaking activity of corporations. (p. 101)

Part Two 
The second part of the book explains Fuller's getting a perspective.

Chapter 4 - Self-Disciplines of Buckminster Fuller 
Fuller's diary, the "Chronofile", is intended to show how much a single human being with little money can do to influence world affairs (p. 128). The mechanical principle of precession is used as a metaphor for the ability of a person to influence the world by applying pressure in an unconventional direction (p. 144). Fuller's religious beliefs are explained (p. 151).

Fuller observed that when he did things for the benefit of others, it had a positive effect on his life, but when he did things merely for his personal benefit, the outcome was negative. This eventually led him to the proposition that if he dedicated his life to the betterment of humanity, he would achieve the greatest positive outcome. So he decided to live his entire life as an experiment to prove or disprove this proposition. He writes (p. 145):

Chapter 5 - The Geoscope 
The Geoscope is a large-scale, animated globe of the Earth intended to help people visualise the spatial and temporal patterns of human activity, either in real time or replayed at different speeds. If the human mind is presented with all of this information at once, it should be able to use its visual pattern-detecting abilities to solve complex problems such as weather-forecasting, resource conflicts, and wars (p. 183). Data for the Geoscope can come from the world maps produced by the USA, using radio triangulation, during and after World War II (p. 184). Geodesic domes will be built to enclose entire cities (p. 179). Afghanistan was the heartland of the Cold War world, as it gave the USSR the potential of a route through Iran to the Indian Ocean (p. 194).

Chapter 6 - World Game 
The World Game is a simulation of global economic activity. Computers can be used to calculate the optimal answer to any economic, technological or social question. The computers will tell us that the true cost to the environment of using fossil fuels is prohibitive, and renewable energy should be used instead. The true energy cost of a gallon of gasoline is more than one million (1980) US dollars. The amount of scrap metals in circulation means that no more mining is necessary (p. 205). A global electrical supply grid will enable more efficient use of energy, and make intermittent renewable energy more practical (p. 202).

Part Three 
This part of the book explains Fuller's plan to set humanity on the path to a sustainable existence with no need to fight over resources.

Chapter 7 - Critical Path: Part One 
Education is key to improving humanity's living conditions (p. 232). The USSR tried to destabilise the US education system by inciting its students to riot (p. 236). The Apollo Project had a critical path of two million tasks, one million of which required new technological solutions (p. 248). Fuller has applied a similar project-planning approach to the saving of humanity, and has created a list of critical-path items (p. 248).

Chapter 8 - Critical Path: Part Two 
Unlike the Apollo Project, the critical-path items in the project to save humanity can all be accomplished with existing technologies (p. 253). A global video education system must be developed (p. 265).

Chapter 9 - Critical Path: Part Three 
Corn is wasted in generating unnecessarily fatty but more profitable beef (p. 272). 

In Los Angeles, private-incinerator and later car-pollution laws were passed to shift the blame for smog from industry to citizens (p. 279). 

In 1929 the USSR used its gold wealth relative to the USA's poverty to pay United States industry to set up industries in USSR, in USSR's first three 5-year plans (p. 289).

Chapter 10 - Critical Path: Part Four 

The first task in humanity's critical path is to build a global electricity grid (p. 309). The second task is to provide movable dwellings for all - city-sized and family-sized domes (p. 310). Fuller has the following designs ready for production: the Fly's Eye Dome (p. 311); Old Man River's City project, East St. Louis (p. 315); Raleigh cotton mill (p. 325); Growth House - sustainable greenhouse (p. 329); O-Volving shelves (p. 331); tetrahedral floating city (p. 333); Cloud Nines - spherical floating cities (p. 336); 8,000-foot Tokyo Tower (p. 338); containerised passenger air travel (p. 340).

Appendices 
 Appendix I - Chronology of Scientific Discoveries and Artifacts
 Appendix II - Chronological Inventory of Prominent Scientific, Technological, Economic, and Political World Events: 1895 to Date

Concepts 
 Critical path. The title of the book is a term used in project planning. To estimate the completion date of a project, a chart is drawn showing all of the necessary sub-tasks and their durations, placed in chronological order. The last task cannot begin until all of tasks on which it depends have been completed. These tasks depend, in turn, on other tasks. It is usually possible to draw numerous paths through the chart from beginning to end, but it is the longest path, called the critical path, that determines the time that the project will take to complete. The book refers frequently to the Apollo Project, which was planned using this method. Fuller's plan to reorganise the global economy in a sustainable way also has a critical path, which is identified in the book.
 Spaceship Earth. The Earth's material resources, like those of a spaceship, are finite. The book explains that early humans did not understand this, because the Earth seemed like a boundless flat surface. We now know that the Earth is a sphere, and this fact should inform all of our decisions.
 Personal integrity. Critical Path is part manifesto, part autobiography. Fuller admits in one place that this is "egostistical" (p. 378), but excuses this by saying that he wants to show not just his conclusions, but also the thought processes that led to them. He believes that every person must think for himself and take as little as possible on trust (p.xi).

Criticism

See also 
Operating Manual for Spaceship Earth
Technocracy movement

References

External links 
Global Energy Network Institute

1981 non-fiction books
Books by Buckminster Fuller
Futurology books
Works about the theory of history
Books about economic history
Technology books